Gaysville is an unincorporated village in the town of Stockbridge, Windsor County, Vermont, United States. Gaysville has a post office with ZIP code 05746.

References

Unincorporated communities in Windsor County, Vermont
Unincorporated communities in Vermont